The 1924 Northwestern Wildcats team represented Northwestern University during the 1924 Big Ten Conference football season. In their third year under head coach Glenn Thistlethwaite, the Wildcats compiled a 4–4 record (1–3 against Big Ten Conference opponents) and finished in a tie for eighth place in the Big Ten Conference.

Schedule

References

Northwestern
Northwestern Wildcats football seasons
Northwestern Wildcats football